Coenia is a genus of shore flies in the family Ephydridae.

Species
C. alpina Mathis, 1975
C. caucasica Krivosheina, 2001
C. curvicauda (Meigen, 1830)
C. deserta Krivosheina, 2001
C. elbergi Dahl, 1974
C. palustris (Fallén, 1823)

References

Ephydridae
Brachycera genera
Diptera of North America
Diptera of Europe
Taxa named by Jean-Baptiste Robineau-Desvoidy